Kaho Nakayama may refer to:
 Kaho Nakayama (writer)
 Kaho Nakayama (handballer)